Levi Yitzchok of Berditchev (Levi Yitzchok Derbarmdiger (compassionate in Yiddish) or Rosakov) (1740–1809), also known as the holy Berdichever, and the Kedushas Levi, was a Hasidic master and Jewish leader. He was the rabbi of Ryczywół, Żelechów, Pinsk and Berdychiv, for which he is best known. He was one of the main disciples of the Maggid of Mezritch, and of his disciple Rabbi Shmelke of Nikolsburg, whom he succeeded as rabbi of Ryczywół.

Levi Yitzchok was known as the "defense attorney" for the Jewish people ("Sneiguron Shel Yisroel"), because he would intercede on their behalf before God. Known for his compassion for every Jew, he was one of the most beloved leaders of Eastern European Jewry. He is considered by some to be the founder of Hasidism in central Poland. And known for his fiery service of God.

Today, there are several synagogues called Berditshev, of which the rabbis of some are called Berditshever Rebbes.

Life
Levi Yitzchak was born in the year 5500 (1740 CE) to Rabbi Meir (who was the Av Beit Din of Zamosc) and Sarah-Sasha Ruskov in Husakov. Was known in his youth as the Illui from Yaroslav. Married to Perel, the daughter of Rabbi Israel Peretz of Levertov (grandson of Rabbi Yitzchak Meir Teomim-Frenkel Rav of Zolkawa son of Rabbi Yonah Teomim-Frenkel), and when she died she was over 100 years old. After his wedding, he went to the Maggid of Mezritsch where he studied for several years.

Levi Yitzchok was known to have a very close relationship with Schneur Zalman of Liadi, the first Chabad Rebbe.

Rabbi Nachman of Breslov called him the Peér (glory) of Israel.

Levi Yitzchok composed some popular Hasidic religious folk songs, including A Dude'le and "The Kaddish of Rebbe Levi Yitzchok (A din Toyre mit Gott)." The Yiddish prayer "God of Abraham" recited by many Jewish people at the close of the Sabbath is attributed to him.

He died on the 25th of Tishrei, 5570 (October 5, 1809) and is buried in the old Jewish cemetery in Berdychiv, Ukraine, then under the control of the Russian Empire.

He had three sons. The oldest one, Maier, died at a young age. The second one, Israel, succeeded his father as leader of the Hasidic movement. One of Levi Yitzchok's grandsons married the daughter of Dovber Schneuri, the second Chabad rebbe and the first to live in Lubavitch.

Works 
Rabbi Levi Yitzchok of Berditchev authored:
The "supreme"  Hasidic classic  Kedushas Levi: a commentary on Torah - arranged according to the weekly Torah portion - and the Jewish holidays, drawing on (and expanding) early Hasidic philosophy, as well as Talmud and Midrash. In it R' Levi discusses also various points of Jewish Law. It was published first in 1798, and reprinted numerous times since; an English Translation was published in 2009.
Beis Levi: his commentary on Pirkei Avos.

Books about Levi Yitzchok of Berditchev 
 Loving and Beloved: Tales of Rabbi Levi Yitzhak of Berdichev, Defender of Israel (Menorah Books, 2016) 
  Sparks from Berditchov

References

External links 
R. Levi Yitzchak of Berditchev
"The Berdichever Rabbi"
Commemorative coin from Levi Yitzchok of Berdychiv, from recently discovered seal
http://www.chassidusonline.com/search?q=kedushas+levi

1740 births
1809 deaths
18th-century rabbis from the Russian Empire
19th-century rabbis from the Russian Empire
Hasidic rebbes
Jewish musicians
Ukrainian musicians
Russian musicians
Orthodox rabbis from Galicia (Eastern Europe)
19th-century musicians from the Russian Empire
Students of Dov Ber of Mezeritch